The 1884 United States presidential election in Florida took place on November 4, 1884, as part of the 1884 United States presidential election. Florida voters chose four representatives, or electors, to the Electoral College, who voted for president and vice president.

Florida was won by Grover Cleveland, the 28th governor of New York, (D–New York), running with the former governor of Indiana Thomas A. Hendricks, with 52.96% of the popular vote, against Secretary of State James G. Blaine (R-Maine), running with Senator John A. Logan, with 46.73% of the vote.

Results

Results by county

References 

Florida
1884
1884 Florida elections